Ernst Nevanlinna , originally Neovius, (10 May 1873 – 7 September 1932) was a Finnish politician. He was born in Pielisjärvi, Lieksa, and was professor of economics in the University of Turku and editor in chief of Uusi Suomi newspaper from 1921 to 1922.

He was a member of the Senate of Finland as well as member of the parliament from 1907 to 1913 and from 1916 to 1922 and Speaker of the Parliament of Finland in 1918.

He died in Helsinki, aged 59, and is buried in the Hietaniemi Cemetery in Helsinki.

References

1873 births
1932 deaths
People from Lieksa
People from Kuopio Province (Grand Duchy of Finland)
Finnish Party politicians
National Coalition Party politicians
Finnish senators
Speakers of the Parliament of Finland
Members of the Parliament of Finland (1907–08)
Members of the Parliament of Finland (1908–09)
Members of the Parliament of Finland (1909–10)
Members of the Parliament of Finland (1910–11)
Members of the Parliament of Finland (1911–13)
Members of the Parliament of Finland (1916–17)
Members of the Parliament of Finland (1917–19)
Members of the Parliament of Finland (1919–22)
20th-century Finnish economists
People of the Finnish Civil War (White side)
University of Helsinki alumni
Burials at Hietaniemi Cemetery
19th-century Finnish economists